The Kind Diet: A Simple Guide to Feeling Great, Losing Weight and Saving the Planet is a vegan cookbook written by actress and animal rights activist Alicia Silverstone.

Silverstone told New York Times interviewer Patrick Healy that for three years she has turned down roles in films and television to have time to work on her book, as well as do plays.

A follow up book was published in 2014, The Kind Mama.

References

External links
Author's website

2009 non-fiction books
Vegan cookbooks